Sains is a locality in Brittany in northern France.

History
Treaties between France and England placed Brittany under English rule. In 1402 the French and English were getting along a little better, after many decades of disputes in 1518 a treaty was signed giving England ownership of Brittany, hostages were handed over by the French as a guarantee that the treaty would be honoured.

The Lords of Sains in Brittany were party to many of the meetings and discussions, and involved in agreeing terms. Whilst the agreements were made Brittany was still disputed for many years later and eventually fell back into French hands.

1402 September 19 - Letters of the King of France, appointing Lancelot de Longvilliers, sire d'Engoudsent, his Chamberlain and Jehan de Sains, Chancellor of Amiens, his secretary, to treat with the envoys of Henry IV: Corbeil (addressed to Henry IV's envoys)

1521 February 4 - Powers by Francis, King of France, to John de Sains, Lord of Marigny, to arrange for the exchange of four out of the eight hostages surrendered to Henry VIII. in accordance with the treaty of 8 October 1518, four having been already released. Romorantin.

Geography of Brittany